Xhoaphryx is a monotypic moth genus of the family Hepialidae. The only described species is X. lemeei of Vietnam.

References

External links
Hepialidae genera

Hepialidae
Monotypic moth genera
Taxa named by Pierre Viette
Exoporia genera
Moths of Asia